The 1902 All England Championships was a badminton tournament held at the Central Transept, The Crystal Palace in Sydenham, London, England, from 18–20 March 1902.

Scoring in the singles went back to the first to 15 (for a game) following the previous year when it was 11. There were five rounds in the men's singles but the other events consisted of four rounds. The 1901 edition has been such a success that the Badminton Association put on extra events of a handicap nature. There were 47 entries for men and 49 for women and it was the first time that players from Scotland and Ireland entered. John Stokes & Thomas Good became the first non-English winners of an event although it was not considered one of the five 'Championship events'.

However there were only 9 entries for the women's doubles.

Final results

Men's singles

Women's singles

Men's doubles

Women's doubles

Mixed doubles

References

All England Open Badminton Championships
All England
All England Open Badminton Championships in London
All England Championships
All England Badminton Championships